The 1984–85 Major Indoor Soccer League season was the seventh in league history and ended with the San Diego Sockers winning their second MISL title in three seasons over the Baltimore Blast. It was the Sockers' fourth straight indoor title, as they had also won the North American Soccer League's indoor league in the spring of 1984.

Recap
With the NASL near death in the summer of 1984, a handful of teams made plans to switch from outdoor to indoor soccer once the NASL season ended in October. Along with the Sockers, the Chicago Sting, Minnesota Strikers and New York Cosmos formally made the leap in late August. With the addition of the Dallas Sidekicks, the league went back to a 14-team, two-division setup.

With an influx of new teams, the league expanded the playoffs even further. 10 teams would qualify, the top three in each division and the next best four wild-card teams. The wild-card teams would play a best-of-three series. The second and third round were best-of-five series, and the championship round would be a best-of-seven series. Each successive round would see the winners reseeded, similar to the NHL playoff format used for almost 20 years.

While the Sting and Strikers made the playoffs, the Cosmos struggled. On February 22, with their record at 11-22, the team announced they were pulling out of the MISL effective immediately. The league would scramble to fill out the schedule, but only the Wichita Wings would play an uneven number of games.

The Strikers would make a run from the wildcard series to the league semifinals, only falling to San Diego in a decisive fifth game. Trailing in the series two games to one, Minnesota actually lost the fourth game in a shootout, but lodged a protest with commissioner Francis Dale over San Diego's shooting order. Dale upheld the protest and declared the Strikers winners. Despite the Sockers only being made aware of the fifth game once they landed at the San Diego airport, they shut out Minnesota to win the series

This would be the final year the MISL would have games aired on network television, CBS broadcast Game 4 of the championship series live on May 25.

Despite having the league's third-best record, the Las Vegas Americans would be terminated by the league after the season due to financial difficulties.

Teams

Regular season schedule

The 1984–85 regular season schedule ran from November 2, 1984, to April 14, 1985. 
Despite the Cosmos leaving the league in mid-season, each team played their scheduled 48 games with the exception of Wichita.

Final standings

Playoff teams in bold.

Playoffs

Wildcard Series

Quarterfinals

Semifinals

**San Diego won the shootout 4-3, but Minnesota appealed the result, as the Sockers used an ineligible player. The Strikers were declared winners on May 13.

Championship Series

Regular season player statistics

Scoring leaders

GP = Games Played, G = Goals, A = Assists, Pts = Points

Leading goalkeepers

Note: GP = Games played; Min = Minutes played; GA = Goals against; GAA = Goals against average; W = Wins; L = Losses

Playoff player statistics

Scoring leaders

GP = Games Played, G = Goals, A = Assists, Pts = Points

Leading goalkeepers

Note: GP = Games played; Min = Minutes played; GA = Goals against; GAA = Goals against average; W = Wins; L = Losses

All-MISL teams

League awards
 Most Valuable Player: Steve Zungul, San Diego
 Scoring Champion: Steve Zungul, San Diego
 Pass Master: Steve Zungul, San Diego
 Defender of the Year: Kevin Crow, San Diego
 Rookie of the Year: Ali Kazemaini, Cleveland
 Goalkeeper of the Year: Scott Manning, Baltimore
 Coach of the Year: Peter Wall, Los Angeles
 Championship Series Most Valuable Player: Steve Zungul, San Diego

Team attendance totals

References

External links
 The Year in American Soccer – 1985
 1985 page – Dallas Sidekicks Memorial Archive
 1984-85 summary at The MISL: A Look Back

Major Indoor Soccer League (1978–1992) seasons
Maj
1985 in American soccer leagues